Lobesia porrectana is a moth of the  family Tortricidae. It was described by Zeller in 1847. It is found in France and Spain and on Corsica, Sardinia, Sicily and Malta.

References

External links
 Lobesia porrectana in animaldiversity catalog

Moths described in 1847
Olethreutini
Moths of Asia
Moths of Europe